The Belmont Theatre, formerly York Little Theatre, is a community theater in York, Pennsylvania, founded on February 5, 1933, as part of the Little Theatre Movement.

Early years
The theatre initially borrowed space from the local Women's Club, the York Collegiate Institute, and the local YWCA. Its first full-length performance was Lady Windermere's Fan at the Phineas Davis School Auditorium on December 14, 1933.

After two unsuccessful attempts at securing its own real estate, the theatre acquired a permanent home at the Elmwood Theatre, a former cinema built and opened in 1949. After a lease-purchase agreement was signed in July 1953, the theatre gained title to the building seven years ahead of schedule in May 1956.

Leadership and growth
Bert Smith was artistic director from 1953 until 1982.  Eric Bradley Long was artistic director until 2010. Rene Staub became artistic director in 2012, while Lyn Bergdoll became executive director that year.

A  addition to the theatre was completed in 1997, after more than $1 million was raised under the leadership of Henry Leader, brother of former Pennsylvania governor George M. Leader.

After 2012, the theatre recovered from its own major financial crisis suffered in the wake of the financial crisis of 2007–08, paying off debts and making long-overdue improvements to the building and stage equipment.

Changes
According to the executive director, Lyn Bergdoll, the theatre was renamed after its street in mid-2016 due to a migration of the former name's meaning. While "little theater" originally connoted "community theater", it has more recently been applied to "children's theater" or "smaller productions".

The theatre's most enduring fundraiser has been an annual food stand at the York Fair, at which steak sandwiches are sold.  The stand was started in 1957 by Betty Gerberick and run by volunteers. A partnership with the local Roosevelt Tavern began in 2017 to operate the stand from 2018 onward.

Alumni
Notable theatre alumni include Rebecca Wisocky and Sam Freed.

References

1933 establishments in Pennsylvania
Theatre companies in Pennsylvania
Buildings and structures in York, Pennsylvania
Tourist attractions in York County, Pennsylvania